The Last Blues Album Volume 1 is a jazz album recorded by Buddy Rich and released on the Groove Merchant Record label in 1974.

Track listing
LP side A:
"Soft Winds" – 7:17	
"Sweet Georgia Brown" – 6:32	
"How Long" – 4:53	
LP side B:
"Courage" – 9:20	
"Alright" – 7:20

Personnel
Buddy Rich – drums
Bob Cranshaw – bass
Kenny Barron – piano
George Freeman – guitar
Jimmy McGriff – organ
Illinois Jacquet – tenor saxophone

References

Groove merchant GM 3303
The Last Blues Album, Vol 1 at discogs.com

1974 albums
Buddy Rich albums
Albums produced by Sonny Lester
Groove Merchant albums